The County Championship is an annual first-class cricket league competition for county cricket clubs in England and Wales. The league is contested on a round-robin basis and the championship awarded to the team that is top of the league at the end of the season. Surrey County Cricket Club are the current champions, claiming the title in the 2022 season.

The first references to county cricket come during the early 18th century, during which time cricket was played almost exclusively in the south-east of England, with teams representing Kent, Middlesex, London and Surrey frequently playing each other. The sport soon became popular through the rest of the country, and by the end of the 18th century, the game was being played nationwide. In 1744, Kent faced "All England" and became the first notional English cricket champions, winning by one wicket. Cricket was played at both club and county level equally through the next hundred years, and it was only in the 1870s that county cricket started to be played frequently and regularly: in 1870 there were 22 regular fixtures, while ten years later there were 188.

The title of "Champion County" was awarded intermittently and unreliably from 1826, with no team other than Kent, Surrey or Sussex being named champions until 1852. Qualification rules were introduced in 1873, and for a long time this was considered the start of the County Championship, but the "Champion County" continued to be inconsistently awarded as late as 1886, when Cricket Magazine named Surrey champions, while most other publications agreed upon Nottinghamshire. After a meeting of the principal clubs' secretaries in 1889, a method of ranking the teams was agreed upon, and the 1890 season is considered the first official competing of the County Championship. The inaugural winners of the competition were Surrey, who won nine of their fourteen matches. The championship grew rapidly in its infancy, and had doubled to have 16 member clubs by 1905. Glamorgan joined in 1921, becoming the only non-English county to compete, and Durham became the most recent addition, entering in 1992.

Surrey and Yorkshire each won six of the first thirteen championships, but thereafter the champions diversified, with all but two of the founding member clubs winning by the outbreak of World War I. Yorkshire dominated the competition between the wars, winning in 12 of the 21 seasons. Long periods of dominance continued after World War II: Surrey were champions seven years running during the 1950s, and Yorkshire then won seven of the following ten championships. Since then no county has managed to achieve the same level of ascendancy. In 2000, the competition was split into two divisions, with the winner of Division One being named as County Champions, a decision endorsed by Wisden Cricketers' Almanack editor Graeme Wright, due to there being "fewer meaningless matches".

Yorkshire hold the record for most championships, with 32, plus a shared win in 1949. The next most successful teams are the two London clubs, Surrey and Middlesex, with 19 (plus one shared) and 11 (plus two shared) titles respectively.

Because of the COVID-19 pandemic, the competition was not held in 2020. Essex won the substitute first-class competition, the Bob Willis Trophy.

For 2021, the new structure of three groups of six county teams was retained for the 2021 County Championship, and the Bob Willis Trophy was contested again as a five-day final between the top two teams in County Championship Division One. Warwickshire and Lancashire finished first and second of County Championship Division One respectively, to play for the Bob Willis Trophy at Lord's with Warwickshire winning the match to become the second winners of the Bob Willis Trophy.

Champions

Performance by county

Notes

References

General

Specific

Bibliography
 

Cricket-related lists
English cricket lists
Winners